The 1972 Victorian Football Association season was the 91st season of the top division of the Australian rules football competition, and the twelfth season of second division competition. The Division 1 premiership was won by the Oakleigh Football Club, after it defeated Dandenong in the Grand Final on 24 September by 44 points; it was Oakleigh's sixth and final Division 1 premiership. The Division 2 premiership was won by Geelong West, which went undefeated through the season with an overall record of 20–0, becoming the first team since  in 1918 to complete a perfect season; overall, it was the club's third Division 2 premiership.

Division 1 
The Division 1 home-and-away season was played over 18 rounds; the top four then contested the finals under the Page–McIntyre system. The finals were played at the St Kilda Cricket Ground.

Ladder

Finals

Awards 
 The leading goalkicker for the season was Len Clark (Preston), who kicked 100 goals in the home-and-away season and 107 goals overall.
 The J. J. Liston Trophy was won by Don McKenzie (Sunshine), who polled 34 votes. McKenzie finished ahead of Brian Ford (Oakleigh), who finished second with 31 votes, and Bob Skilton (Port Melbourne), who finished third with 28 votes.
 Port Melbourne won the seconds premiership. Port Melbourne 14.18 (102) defeated Prahran 9.12 (66) in the Grand Final, played as a stand-alone match on Saturday 16 September.
 Coburg won the lightning premiership. Coburg 6.2 (38) defeated Port Melbourne 3.8 (26) in the Grand Final, played as a curtain-raiser to the senior Grand Final on Sunday 24 September.

Division 2 
The Division 2 home-and-away season was played over eighteen rounds; the top four then contested the finals under the Page–McIntyre system; all finals were played on Sundays at Toorak Park.

Ladder

Finals

Awards 
 The leading goalkicker for Division 2 was Graeme McLean (Geelong West) who kicked 129 goals in the home-and-away season, and 137 goals overall. McLean's total was the highest by any player in a season since Ron Todd kicked 188 goals in 1945.
 The J. Field Medal was won by Wayne Schimmelbusch (Brunswick), who polled 39 votes. Schimmelbusch finished ahead of Ron Brown (Yarraville), who finished second with 36 votes, and John Knott (Yarraville), who finished third with 27 votes.
 Brunswick won the seconds premiership for the second consecutive season. Brunswick 19.14 (128) defeated Frankston 12.16 (88) in the Grand Final, held as a stand-alone match on Saturday 9 September at Northcote Park.

Notable events

Geelong West's perfect season 
Geelong West won all twenty games it played during the 1972 season, becoming the third team to complete a perfect season in Association history. It was the first time the feat had been achieved since  in 1918, and the last time it was achieved until Port Melbourne in 2011. Geelong West entered the season after being relegated from Division 1 at the end of 1971, although it was not disgraced during that season, as its win–loss record of 6–12 was at the time the best ever for a wooden-spooner. Geelong West's Thirds team was also unbeaten during the 1972 season.

Geelong West's unbeaten record hides the fact that it was very evenly matched with runners-up Caulfield; three of Geelong West's four wins against Caulfield, including both finals, were by a goal or less:
 In the home-and-away match on 11 June, which attracted a ground record crowd estimated to be between 10,000 and 12,000 to Geelong's Western Oval, Geelong West 17.10 (112) d. Caulfield 15.18 (108) after Brown for Caulfield missed a set shot for goal on or after the final siren.
 In the second semi-final, Caulfield led Geelong West by one point at the very end of the game. Geelong West ruckman Alex Andjelkovic, who had come on in the final quarter as the 17th man, marked 25-35 yards from goal with seconds remaining; his kick after the siren, an ugly kick with which he also accidentally took a divot out of the ground, just went through for a goal to give Geelong West a five-point victory, Geelong West 17.18 (120) d. Caulfield 17.13 (115).
 In the Grand Final, Geelong West led by 29 points at half time. Caulfield came from behind, scored ten goals to three in the third quarter, with John Williams kicking the first four of those from his first four kicks of the quarter, to lead by 12 points at three-quarter time, but Geelong West fought back in the final quarter to take a six-point lead. Ernie Baker had the chance to tie the game for Caulfield and force a replay, when he was awarded a free kick from 35yds out on an angle in the 32nd minute; his kick was accurate but fell short to be marked in the goal-square, and the siren sounded soon after; Geelong West 14.16 (100) d. Caulfield 14.10 (94).

Lightning premiership 
In 1972, the Association established a post-season lightning premiership, contested by the twelve teams which did not reach the finals (six from each division). Matches were played as curtain-raisers to senior finals matches on Sundays, and were played at half the length of a normal match over two periods of play. The format of the competition was knock-out, and was arranged such that the Division 1 teams competed separately to the Division 2 teams up to the semi-final stage; then, the semi-final stage was contested by three Division 1 teams and one Division 2 team. The post-season lightning premiership was contested from 1972 until 1979.

Other notable events 
 Prior to the season, Port Melbourne recruited two of the greatest players in the history of Australian rules football: Bob Skilton and Ron Barassi. Both players were later among the twelve inaugural Legends inducted into the Australian Football Hall of Fame in 1996, and Skilton was a three-time Brownlow Medallist in the Victorian Football League; so that both were playing alongside each other at Port Melbourne was a substantial recruiting coup for the Association.
 On 9 July, Lyall Henriksen (Dandenong) was reported for assaulting field umpire Andrew Craig, striking him first in the back, then in the stomach as Craig approached to report him. He was suspended until the start of the 1974 season for the incident.
 Early in the final quarter of the game between Oakleigh and Port Melbourne on 20 August, Phil Fryer (Oakleigh) ran into the behind post and snapped it at its base. After a five-minute delay in which no viable repair strategy was developed, an Oakleigh official was assigned to stand on the boundary line and hold the broken post in position for the rest of the game.

External links 
 List of VFA/VFL Premiers

References 

Victorian Football League seasons
VFL